Boris Muñoz (21 May 1969 in Caracas), is a Venezuelan journalist and author of several books, including "La ley de la calle, testimonios de jóvenes protagonistas de la violencia en Caracas" (Fundarte 1995), "Más allá de la ciudad letrada, Crónicas y espacios urbanos" (University of Pittsburgh Press) and "Despachos del imperio" (Random House 2007). Muñoz was Editor-in-chief of "Exceso" magazine. He contributes regularly to magazines and web supported media in Latin America.

Boris Muñoz is a fellow at the Nieman Foundation for Journalism at Harvard. He is a Ph.D in Hispanic American Literature from Rutgers University. Author of several books, including "La ley de la calle, testimonios de jóvenes protagonistas de la violencia en Caracas" (Fundarte, 1995) and "Despachos del imperio" (2008). He co-edited with Silvia Spitta "Más allá de la ciudad letrada, Crónicas y espacios urbanos" (University of Pittsburgh Press, 2003).

He was and Editor-in-Chief of Nueva Sociedad and Editorial Director of "Exceso" magazine, and contributes regularly to "Gatopardo" magazine, and Prodavinci.com.

References

External links

1. Los malditos: Rafael José Muñoz, poeta, guerrillero, metafísico, mi padre, por Boris Muñoz. El Puercoespín (December, 2011). Spanish.

1969 births
Living people
Venezuelan male writers
Venezuelan journalists